Cardinal Carter may refer to:
 Cardinal Carter Academy for the Arts, Catholic arts high school located in Toronto, Ontario, Canada
 Cardinal Carter Catholic High School, Catholic secondary school located in Aurora, Ontario, Canada
 Cardinal Carter Catholic Secondary School, Catholic secondary school located in Leamington, Ontario, Canada
 G. Emmett Cardinal Carter Library, at King's University College (University of Western Ontario)
 Gerald Emmett Carter (1912–2003), Cardinal Archbishop of Toronto